The Power Macintosh 6400 (also sold under variations of the name Performa 6400) is a personal computer designed, manufactured and sold by Apple Computer from August 1996 to August 1997. It is the only Macintosh mini-tower system to be branded as a Performa, and alongside the Performa 6360 was the last new Performa-branded model introduced by Apple.

The 6400 and its Performa variants were discontinued in favor of the uniformly-named Power Macintosh 6500 in August 1997.

Hardware
Logic board: The logic board, code-named "Alchemy", is shared with the Power Macintosh 5400 all-in-one and Performa 6360 desktop models. Alchemy is generally believed to be superior to its 5200/6200 predecessors since it had a 64-bit data path to main memory.

CPU: All 6400 models use a PowerPC 603ev processor that is soldered to the computer's logic board and cooled by a fanless heat-sink. Though initially considered non-upgradable, CPU upgrades did come to market that overrode the fixed CPU by use of the Level 2 cache slot.

Sound: The new "InstaTower" case features an integrated subwoofer speaker and supports SRS surround-sound.  A knob on the back of the case controls the bass level of the subwoofer; this knob only works if external speakers are connected, otherwise the internal speaker provides full sound range.  There are two audio output jacks, one on the front and one on the back.  Headphones plugged into the front jack will disable the internal speaker and rear jack.

Expansion: There are two PCI expansion slots as well as a dedicated communications slot that supports AAUI, Ethernet and fast modem cards.  The communication slot is not compatible with similar slots on other Macintosh computers.  NuBus cards are not supported.

Operating system: The Performa 6400/180 and 6400/200 were shipped with System 7.5.3 Revision 2.1; this particular release was specific to these machines as there were stability problems with System 7.5.3 Release 2 on the new hardware, especially with the video card and transferring files over LocalTalk.

Models
All Performa models shipped with SurfWatch, a product from Spyglass, Inc. that provides adult content filtering capability; content-control software was a significant issue at the time due to the recent passage of the Communications Decency Act in the United States.

Introduced August 5, 1996:
Performa 6400/180: North American consumer model, 180 MHz CPU.
Performa 6400/200: North American consumer model, 200 MHz CPU.
Performa 6400/200 Video Editing Edition: The Performa 6400/200 with an Avid Cinema video I/O card and video editing software, and 

Introduced October 1, 1996: 
Power Macintosh 6400/200: Sold in the North American and British education markets. $2,200 USD.

Introduced November 12, 1996:
Performa 6410: Identical to the Performa 6400/180, sold in Europe and Asia.
Performa 6420: Identical to the Performa 6400/200, sold in Europe and Asia.

Timelines

References

External links
The 6400 Zone, a 6400 and 6500-specific resource site
Performa 6400 at Low End Mac
Performa 6400 at apple-history.com

6400
Macintosh Performa
6400
Macintosh towers
Macintosh case designs
Computer-related introductions in 1996